Education District is a district in Downtown Bakersfield, California. Its predominant businesses are satellite campuses for both public and private colleges and universities. Unlike several other districts in downtown, the Education District did not come about because of formal planning but because like businesses decided to locate themselves together.

History
In the 1970s, Bakersfield College established a satellite campus in a former department store. Although not known as the Education District at the time, it was the first college to establish a presence downtown. In 1997, the Bakersfield City School District established the Downtown Elementary School nearby. When University Square, which served as a satellite campus for UC Merced and Santa Barbara Business College, was constructed in 2001, the education district had been formally established.

Educational institutions
The following educational institutions are located in the district:
 Bakersfield College (satellite campus)
 Downtown Elementary School
 Santa Barbara Business College
 University of La Verne
 University of California, Merced (satellite campus)

References

Neighborhoods in Bakersfield, California